The volleyball tournaments of NCAA Season 91 started on November 30, 2015. The Colegio de San Juan de Letran is currently hosting the tournament. Games are played at the Filoil Flying V Arena in San Juan, with two women's and men's games. The women's and men's semifinals' and finals' games are aired live by ABS-CBN Sports and Action and in High Definition on ABS-CBN Sports and Action HD 166.

Women's tournament

Elimination round

|}

Season host is boldfaced.

Point system:
 3 points = win match in 3 or 4 sets
 2 points = win match in 5 sets
 1 point  = lose match in 5 sets
 0 point  = lose match in 3 or 4 sets

Playoffs

First round

Second round

Finals

Finals' Most Valuable Player: Jeanette Panaga ( CSB)
Coach of the Year: Michael Cariño ( CSB)

Awards
Season Most Valuable Player: Grethcel Soltones ( San Sebastian)
Rookie of the Year: Nieza Viray ( San Beda)
Best Server: Maria Shola May Alvarez ( JRU)
Best Spiker: Christine Joy Rosario ( Arellano)
Best Blocker: Jeanette Panaga ( CSB)
Best Setter: Rhea Marist Ramirez ( Arellano)
Best Receiver: Melanie Torres ( CSB)
Best Digger: Alyssa Eroa ( San Sebastian)
Best Scorer: Grethcel Soltones ( San Sebastian)

Men's tournament

Elimination round

|}

Season host is boldfaced.

Point system:
 3 points = win match in 3 or 4 sets
 2 points = win match in 5 sets
 1 point  = lose match in 5 sets
 0 point  = lose match in 3 or 4 sets

Playoffs

Finals' Most Valuable Player: Rey Taneo, Jr. ( Perpetual)
Coach of the Year: Sinfronio Acaylar ( Perpetual)

Awards
Season Most Valuable Player: Howard Mojica  (EAC)
Rookie of the Year: Walt Amber Gervacio ( San Sebastian)
Best Server: Howard Mojica ( EAC)
Best Spiker: Howard Mojica ( EAC)
Best Blocker: Angelino Pertierra ( Mapúa)
Best Setter: John Carlos Desuyo ( San Beda)
Best Receiver: Ajian Dy ( CSB)
Best Digger: Dion Canlas ( Mapúa)
Best Scorer: Howard Mojica ( EAC)

Juniors Tournament
Perpetual Help Altas retained their NCAA Season 91 Junior's Volleyball title after defeating EAC Generals in two games. Jody Severo is the Finals MVP.

Awards
Most Valuable Player (Season):  Ralph Joshua Pitogo ( EAC)
Most Valuable Player (Finals): Jody Severo ( UPHSD)
Coach of the Year: Sandy Rieta ( UPHSD)
Rookie of the Year: Ralph Joshua Pitogo ( EAC)
Best Server: Michael Vince Imperial ( EAC)
Best Spiker: Ryuji Condrad Etorma ( UPHSD)
Best Blocker: Ralph Joshua Pitogo ( EAC)
Best Setter: Gabriel EJ Casana ( UPHSD)
Best Receiver: Ceejay Hicap ( EAC)
Best Digger: Barrie Roldan ( Arellano)
Best Scorer: Aldimal Waham ( Arellano)

Beach volleyball
The NCAA Season 91 beach volleyball tournament will be held on February 10–14, 2016 at the Marina Bay Resort, Subic, Zambales. These are the winners in the four-day event that has been televised on ABS-CBN Sports and Action on February 16.

See also

UAAP Season 78 volleyball tournaments
NCAA Season 91

External links
Official website

References

2015 in Philippine sport
NCAA
NCAA (Philippines) volleyball tournaments
2015 in volleyball
2016 in volleyball